Lines (Greek: "Γραμμές")  is a 2016 Greek feature film, directed by the Greek director, writer and producer Vassilis Mazomenos.

Plot
The film refers to a modern-day Greek tragedy, focused on seven individuals suffering in the economic crisis that has devastated Greece . The source of the film comes from the numerous suicides that were prompted by the economic crash (2009-).

Cast
 Themis Panou as P.M.
 Tasos Nousias as farmer
 Anna Kalaitzidou as manager
 Thodoros Katsafados as homeless man
 Kostas Berikopoulos as factory owner
 Thanassis Chalkias as husband of sick wife
 Vassilis Georgosopoulos as policeman
 Leonidas Kakouris as call operator
 Kostas Dalianis as CEO
 Kostas Xikominos as police officer
 Adrian Frieling as E.U. clerk 
 Nikos Pantelidis as P.M. secretary
 Thekla Gaiti as sick wife
 Ileana Panagiotouni as factory owner's sister
 Evita Papaspirou as E.U. secretary

Festivals
The world premiere of the film was made on 21 November 2016, at the Tallinn Black Nights Film Festival in the main competition programme, Also was in main competition at the 37th Fantasporto International Film Festival. and official selection at the 9th Bengaluru International Film Festival in India, at 28th Ankara International Film Festival, at Paris Panorama of contemporary Greek cinema 2017, at
10th London Greek Film Festival 2017, at 11th Los Angeles Greek Film Festival 2017, at 24th Greek Film Festival in Australia, at 2017 BLOW-UP · International Arthouse FILM FEST in Chicago, at 10th  "this human world – International Human Rights Film Festival" in Vienna Austria, at 2017 Maverick Movie Awards, at Calgary European Film Festival in Canada, at Edinburgh GIFF in Scotland, at Accolade Global Film Competition in California, at Hellas FilmBox in Berlin, at FEST (Belgrade) 46th IFF, at 6th Montreal Greek film festival in Canada, at 22nd European film festival Bucharest in Romania, at 27th DU CINÉMA GREC in Strasbourg, at 2018 South-East European Film Festival in Berlin and Paris, at Scandinavian International Film Festival στο Helsinki, at 13th International Human Rights Film Festival, Albania, at Sose International Film Festival in Yerevan, Armenia, at Chania Film Festival in Greece, at Rome Independent Prisma Awards in Italy.

Awards
Lines was nominated for the best film in 2016 Tallinn Black Nights Film Festival, in 37th Fantasporto International Film Festival, in 2017 Los Angeles Greek Film Festival, in 30th Athens Panorama of European Cinema, in 10th "this human world" in Vienna, in 2018 Hellas FilmBox on Berlin, in 8th Philosophical IFF in Macedonia. The film won the best concept award for Fiction Feature in the 10th London Greek Film Festival. In 2017 Maverick Movie Awards Lines won award for best directing and had two nominations for best picture and best screenplay. The film was also nominee for best director (Tarkovsky Award) and best writing (Tonino Guerra Award) in 2017 BLOW-UP · International Arthouse FILM FEST in Chicago and in Accolade Competition 2017 in United States won the award of Merit. In 2018 was nominated for best film in Hellenic Film Academy (Greek) awards. In 2018 in See film festival Berlin Paris Lines awarded with the director's award. Αt Scandinavian International Film Festival Helsinki and at Rome Independent Prisma Awards in Italy the film won in both the best feature award. At 5th Sose International Film Festival (2018) in Armenia the film won best script and best camera awards. In 2019 the film won Best Drama in Vegas Movie Awards.

Reviews
Giampietro Balia wrote in the Tallinn Black Nights Film Festival catalogue: " A stifling symphony of defeat for human kind as a whole, "Lines" is a necessary film in times in which numbers and ideological yarns dominate the political agenda, much to the disadvantage of the millions of individuals ensnared in a system that has proven to be frail and unreliable." Also in the same festival's official page is written : "Director Vasilis Mazomenos offers a uncompromisingly bleak, ghastly and haunting view of modern Greece in "Lines". Seven chapters about seven broken individuals, about what it means to live in Greece in these hard times of financial restraint". Liina Laugesaar wrote in Cineuropa: "Lines does not focus on the political side of the crisis, but concentrates on the people who had to endure it. Everything extraneous is left out of the story. Mazomenos puts faces back on the numbers and creates a harrowing testament to the challenging years that have left scars on many." Élie Castiel wrote in Séquences:  "A movie shock, surprising, nocturnal, shouting his rage through seven tables, seven paintings of durations approximately equal, the whole forming a coherent whole despite the side Byzantine intentionally of each Party. Straight lines, circulars, symmetrical, disordered also, as if the logic of the ancient Greece had disappeared for ever"

References

External links 
 
 https://linesmovie.wordpress.com/
 https://www.youtube.com/watch?v=bX81w4-pzwg
 http://www.filmfestivals.com/blog/tallinn_black_nights_film_festival/lines_a_film_by_vassilis_mazomenos_main_competition_at_tallinn_black_night_fillm
 http://www.filmfestivals.com/blog/fantasporto/vassilis_mazomenos_returns_to_fantasporto_with_his_latest_feature_film_lines
 http://cineuropa.org/f.aspx?t=film&l=en&did=319132
 http://www.magazine-hd.com/apps/wp/fantasporto-5-filmes-lines/
 http://cine.gr/film.asp?id=722459&page=1
 http://www.ruadebaixo.com/fantasporto-2017-reportagem-14-03-2017.html

Greek drama films
2016 films
Greek nonlinear narrative films
2010s psychological drama films
2010s Greek-language films
Films about psychiatry
2010s avant-garde and experimental films
Films about self-harm
Films about suicide
2010s political drama films
Films about poverty
Films about financial crises
Films about death
Films set in Athens
Films shot in Greece